The Beanie Bubble is an upcoming American comedy-drama film directed by Kristin Gore and Damian Kulash and written by Gore, based on the 2015 non-fiction book The Great Beanie Baby Bubble by Zac Bissonnette. It stars Zach Galifianakis, Elizabeth Banks, Sarah Snook and Geraldine Viswanathan.

Cast
 Zach Galifianakis
 Elizabeth Banks
 Sarah Snook
 Geraldine Viswanathan

Production
It was announced in January 2022 that Apple TV+ had acquired the distribution rights for the film, which would see Zach Galifinakis, Elizabeth Banks, Sarah Snook and Geraldine Viswanathan star, with Kristin Gore and Damian Kulash directing.

Filming began by April 2022 in Marietta, Georgia. Production would also take place in Atlanta.

References

External links
 

Upcoming films
American comedy-drama films
Apple TV+ original films
Beanie Babies
Films about toys
Films based on non-fiction books
Films produced by Brian Grazer
Films produced by Ron Howard
Films shot in Atlanta
Imagine Entertainment films
Upcoming English-language films